Search and Destroy is a 1995 drama film based on a stage play by Howard Korder and directed by David Salle.  The film stars Griffin Dunne, repeating his role from the stage production, Rosanna Arquette, Illeana Douglas, Ethan Hawke, Dennis Hopper, John Turturro and Christopher Walken, and features Martin Scorsese as "The Accountant." Salle was nominated for the Grand Special Prize at the Deauville American Film Festival.

Plot 
Middle-aged Martin Mirkhein (Griffin Dunne) is a complete failure. He's run a successful business into debt, his marriage is falling apart, and now he owes the IRS $147,956 in back taxes. Martin may not have much going for him but he has read "Daniel Strong," a best-selling, self-help novel by the popular TV guru Dr. Waxling (Dennis Hopper). Now he wants to turn the novel into a major motion picture. To do that, Martin needs the rights and the revenue. Given his grating personality and terrible track record, it won't be easy to get hold of either. He sets out to meet with Dr. Waxling but ends up sleeping with Waxling's screenwriter-assistant Marie (Illeana Douglas) instead. Determined to make a movie, Martin and Marie move to New York. There, they get involved with wealthy Kim Ulander (Christopher Walken), an enigmatic businessman with quirky tendencies and a repressed desire to live dangerously. If they aren't careful, this daring duo may not come out of this deal alive.

Cast
Griffin Dunne as Martin Mirkheim
Dennis Hopper as Dr. Luther Waxling 
Christopher Walken as Kim Ulander 
John Turturro as Ron
Ethan Hawke as Roger 
Rosanna Arquette as Lauren Mirkheim 
Robert Knepper as Daniel Strong 
Illeana Douglas as Marie Davenport
Martin Scorsese as The Accountant
Jason Ferraro as Young Daniel Strong  
David Thornton as Rob 
Karole Armitage as Red River Valley dancer
Dan Hedaya as Tailor

Reviews
Search and Destroy maintains a 33% positive rating at Rotten Tomatoes.

Notes

External links 

1995 films
1990s crime comedy films
American satirical films
American crime comedy films
American independent films
1990s English-language films
Films scored by Elmer Bernstein
Films about filmmaking
American films based on plays
Mafia comedy films
1995 comedy films
1995 independent films
1990s American films